Londonderry Township may be any of the following places:

In Canada
Township of Londonderry, Nova Scotia

United States 
Londonderry Township, Ohio
Londonderry Township, Bedford County, Pennsylvania
Londonderry Township, Chester County, Pennsylvania
Londonderry Township, Dauphin County, Pennsylvania

Township name disambiguation pages